The 2006 European Taekwondo Championships were held in Bonn, Germany. The event held from 26 to 28 May 2006. The title matches were organized by the European Taekwondo Union (ETU). A total of 16 competitions were held, eight each for women and men in different weight classes.

Medal table

Medal summary

Men

Women

References

External links 
 European Taekwondo Union

European Taekwondo Championships
International sports competitions hosted by Germany
2006 in taekwondo
2006 in European sport
2006 in German sport